Unione Sportiva Dilettantistica Novese is an Italian football club from Novi Ligure, Piedmont. The club has won the 1921–22 Italian Football Championship, but plays now in Promozione.

Novese is the only Italian football team that won a championship without playing a single season in Serie A nor in Serie B.

History
Novese was founded in 1919 and entered Italian history by F.I.G.C. 1921–22 Italian Football Championship, a season when there were two competing major leagues in Italian football: the Federazione Italiana Giuoco Calcio (F.I.G.C.) and the breakaway Confederazione Calcistica Italiana, which included the big clubs of Northern Italy.

Colors and badge
The team colors are white and light blue.

Honours

Domestic competitions
Italian Football Championship
Winners (1): 1921–22

Regional competitions
Promozione
Winners (2): 1920–21, 1953–54
Prima Divisione
Winners (2): 1941–42, 1951–52
Eccellenza Piemonte-Valle d'Aosta
Winners (2): 1997–98, 2003–04
Coppa Italia Dilettanti Piemonte-Valle d'Aosta
Winners (1): 2006–07
Supercoppa Piemonte-Valle d'Aosta
Winners (1): 2003–04

See also
Association football league system in Italy

References

External links
 
 

Football clubs in Italy
Football clubs in Piedmont and Aosta Valley
Novi Ligure
Association football clubs established in 1919
Italian football First Division clubs
Serie A winning clubs
1919 establishments in Italy